Supedi is a village located in the district of Rajkot in the Indian state of Gujarat. Its population is about 7764 persons, living in around 1750 households.

Supedi is located about 9 km from Dhoraji on the banks of the Utavali River. Its high fort wall, small ghats and temples are major attractions.

Temples

Morali Manohar Temple
A beautiful temple older than 750 years, showing various architectural styles like Gujarati ornamental, Rajasthani & Indo-mughal styles. This temple has Shiv temple, Ram temple and the main Krishna temple on the bank of river Utavali.

It is named as Murali Manohar meaning lord Krishna holding murali (flute) in a lovely pose with Radha. This temple has chariot style on top. It depicts incarnations of Vishnu, Shiva-Parvati along with incarnations of goddess Umiya (Durga) on its wall. It has various floral and leaf designs as in Arabic architectures. 

Hindu temples are faced in east (rising sun) direction but only three temples in world like Dwakadhish temple, Dakor temple and this Murali Manohar Temple faces to West (setting sun) direction. 

This historically important structure now needs restoration from archeological department of India as it comes under their property but steps are not taken to protect it. This is a serious thing to be taken under care. Many parts of temple are now damaged and have started falling.

Somnath Temple
Another temple just on the other side of Utavli opposite to Murali Manohar.

Transport

Air 
Rajkot  and Porbandar are the nearest airports.

Road 
Supedi is on National Highway 8B. It connects Supedi with Rajkot, Porbandar, Jamnagar, Gondal and Jetpur. State transport corporation and private bus operators provide bus services.

Railway 
Supedi railway station lies on the Wansjaliya-Jetalsar railway line that connects with Rajkot, the nearest large city. Wansjaliya railway junction is west of Supedi and connects with Porbandar, Jamnagar. Dhoraji railway station and Jetalsar railway junction are east of Supedi and connect with Rajkot. The railway line was metre gauge like all other tracks in Saurashtra and converted to broad gauge in 2011.

Education
Shree Taluka Shala Supedi - for primary education
Shree kanya vidyalaya - for girls' primary education 
Smt. L. N. Govani primary school 
Smt. R. D. Govani High School
Shri J. H. Govani Kanya Vidyalaya
Eva  college of Ayurved

References 

Villages in Rajkot district